David Withers (born 4 April 1948), known as Pick Withers, is an English rock and jazz drummer. He was the original drummer of rock band Dire Straits and played on their first four albums, which included hit singles such as "Sultans of Swing", "Romeo and Juliet" and "Private Investigations". Withers was inducted into the Rock and Roll Hall of Fame as a member of Dire Straits in 2018.

Biography 
Taught by childhood friend Richard Storer, Withers first played a drum in the Boys' Brigade in his home city of Leicester. He became a professional musician at the age of 17, in an Italian band called The Primitives. This was followed by a band called Spring who had a record contract but little success; they released one album on the RCA label. In the mid-1970s Withers was a house drummer at Rockfield Studios near Monmouth, Wales. He played on records by Dave Edmunds, Hobo, the John Dummer Band and the Gary Fletcher Band, amongst others.

His nickname has been subject to some variations in spelling. During his time with Spring, he was billed as "Pique Withers". He is billed as "Pic Withers" on the second Brewers Droop album.

Withers has also studied at Drumtech drum school in London.

Dire Straits 

He met Mark Knopfler  1976 in North London. Knopfler called around to the house Withers was living in to borrow Simon Cowe's reel-to-reel tape recorder, and recorded some music with Withers that same day. Withers was briefly a member of folk-rock outfit Magna Carta in 1977, but once Dire Straits gained a recording contract, turned to drumming for that band full-time.

His style with Dire Straits is distinctive for being restrained, favouring sparse snare drum and hi-hat combinations rather than heavy beats, speed and pyrotechnic flourishes. He played on the Dire Straits albums Dire Straits (1978), Communiqué (1979), Making Movies (1980) and Love Over Gold (1982).

Withers left Dire Straits in the summer of 1982, soon after completing the Love Over Gold sessions. In a 2021 interview in which he was asked why he left, Withers said that the band was becoming too loud, he was tired of the treadmill, and he wanted to try new things. His replacement in Dire Straits was Terry Williams, who like Withers had been a Dave Edmunds sideman.

After Dire Straits 
In 2021, Withers re-surfaced with a new rhythm and blues band called 'Slim Pickin's',  later re-named 'Pick's Pocket'.

Discography

With Dire Straits

With others 
 Spring, Spring
 How Long Is Forever, Prelude
 Slow Train Coming, Bob Dylan
 Giant From The Blue, Gary Fletcher Band
 Sleepwalking, Gerry Rafferty
 A Rare Conundrum, Bert Jansch
 The Booze Brothers, Brewers Droop

References

1948 births
Living people
English rock drummers
English jazz drummers
British male drummers
Dire Straits members
People from Leicester
Musicians from Leicestershire
John Dummer Band members